Séverine Caneele (born 10 May 1974) is a Belgian film actress. She won the award for Best Actress at the 1999 Cannes Film Festival for the film L'humanité.

Filmography
 L'humanité (1999)
 Une part du ciel (2002)
 Quand la mer monte... (2004)
 Holy Lola (2004)
 Rodin (2017)

References

External links

1974 births
Living people
People from West Flanders
Belgian film actresses
Cannes Film Festival Award for Best Actress winners